Gaston Ravel (1878–1958) was a French screenwriter and film director. He made over sixty films, mostly during the silent era. In 1929 he co-directed the historical film The Queen's Necklace.

Selected filmography
 The Knot (1921)
 The Advocate (1925)
 Jocaste (1925)
 Mademoiselle Josette, My Woman (1926)
 A Gentleman of the Ring (1926)
 Madame Récamier (1928)
 The Queen's Necklace (1929)
 Figaro (1929)
 The Stranger (1931)
 Fanatisme (1934)

References

Bibliography
 Klossner, Michael. The Europe of 1500-1815 on Film and Television: A Worldwide Filmography of Over 2550 Works, 1895 Through 2000. McFarland, 2002.

External links

Film directors from Paris
1878 births
1958 deaths
French male screenwriters
20th-century French screenwriters
Silent film screenwriters
20th-century French male writers